⊿ may refer to:
Right triangle, a triangle containing a right angle
Triangle (Perfume album), the third album of techno-pop group Perfume

ja:⊿